Olav Solgaard is a Professor in the Stanford Department of Electrical Engineering. He was the Director of the Ginzton Lab from 2008 until 2014.

Education
Olav Solgaard completed a B. S. Electrical Engineering, from the Norwegian Institute of Technology, Norway in 1981. He completed degrees in Electrical Engineering from Stanford University in 1987 (MS) and 1992 (PhD).

Prior to joining Stanford’s Department of Electrical Engineering in 1999, Olav was a faculty member at the University of California, Davis. His work at UC Davis led to the invention of the multi-wavelength, fiber-optical switch.

Research
Solgaard's research is in the areas of semiconductor fabrication techniques; specifically, microfabrication and integration of optical devices and systems.

Olav Solgaard has been issued more than 70 patents at time of this version (2019).

Awards and honors
 2008 - Fellow of the Optical Society of America
 2008 - Member of the Royal Norwegian Society of Sciences and Letters
 2010 - Fellow of the Norwegian Academy of Technological Sciences
 2017 - Fellow of the IEEE

See also
Grating light valve

References

External links
 Stanford profile, Olav Solgaard
 Google Scholar, Olav Solgaard

Stanford University Department of Electrical Engineering faculty
Living people
American electrical engineers
Stanford University School of Engineering faculty
Stanford University alumni
Electrical engineering academics
Stanford University faculty
Members of the Norwegian Academy of Technological Sciences
Royal Norwegian Society of Sciences and Letters
Year of birth missing (living people)